Rhodobaculum is an alkaliphilic genus of bacteria from the family of Rhodobacteraceae with one known species (Rhodobaculum claviforme). Rhodobaculum claviforme has been isolated from saline alkaline steppe lakes from Siberia.

References

Rhodobacteraceae
Bacteria genera
Monotypic bacteria genera